Breed Street Shul, also known as Congregation Talmud Torah of Los Angeles or Breed Street Synagogue, is an Orthodox Jewish synagogue in the Boyle Heights section of Los Angeles, California.  It was the largest Orthodox synagogue west of Chicago from 1915 to 1951, and is listed in the National Register of Historic Places.

Early history
Congregation Talmud Torah started in 1904, using rented quarters in downtown Los Angeles, at 114 Rose Street. It was started primarily as a Hebrew school ("Talmud Torah" is typically used to mean a supplemental afternoon religious school, though it was also used as a synagogue).

Within a few years, the immigrant population moved, concentrating in Boyle Heights. Several Jews purchased a house at Breed and First, and started using it as a shul. By 1914, the Rose Street location was nonviable, for lack of a quorum (minyan), and the membership merged with the new Breed Street group. In 1915, they purchased a lot two blocks north, and commissioned a new wood-framed building on the present site. It became known as the "Breed Street Shul." The original shul on the site was designed  by O.M. Warner and constructed by Bornstein & Cohn.

Enrollment grew, and by 1918, a second structure was needed on the lot. By 1923, there were 110 students enrolled.

The Jewish population grew from a few hundred in 1910, to 1,842 in 1920, to more than 10,000 in 1930.

Construction of the existing structure
As the size of the congregation grew, a new synagogue was built, designed by the architectural firm of Edelman and Barnett.  The original wood structure was moved to the back of the lot to make room for the new brick structure which opened in 1923.  The new synagogue was built from unreinforced masonry with veneer brick and cast stone embellishments on the facade.  The façade includes alternating bands of dichromatic brickwork, "dense prickly foliage carving", other organic motifs, and Stars of David in bas-relief cast stone detail.

Role in the Boyle Heights community
The Boyle Heights section of Los Angeles, located east of downtown, was home to the city's most populous Jewish community from 1910 to 1950.  The area around Breed Street Shul became a center for the Jewish community.  The business district on Brooklyn Avenue (renamed Cesar Chavez Avenue in 1995) just north of the Shul was the location of many kosher butchers, bakeries, delis, bookstores and other shops catering to the Jewish community.  The Breed Street block where the Shul was located also became home of the Los Angeles Jewish Academy (now part of Yavneh Academy) and Mount Sinai Clinic (a forerunner of Cedars-Sinai Medical Center).

In 1945, Rabbi Osher Zilberstein of Breed Street Shul opened the city's first Jewish parochial elementary school. When Israel was established as an independent nation in 1948, Breed Street Shul was the site of a solemn ceremony in which the new flag of Israel was flown for the first time in Los Angeles.

Dispersal of Boyle Heights Jewish community
In the years after World War II, the Jewish community in Boyle Heights dispersed, moving to areas such as the West Fairfax District, Beverlywood, and Encino.  Rabbi Zilberstein remained at Breed Street Shul until his death in 1973.  Many families, including those of Jewish Veterans of WWII,  went east across the L.A. River to the San Gabriel Valley.

Vacancy and deterioration
The main brick building was vacated in the mid-1980s due to seismic retrofit requirements. Services were moved to the original wooden structure at the rear of the lot for several years. By 1996, services ceased at Breed Street Shul, and the buildings have been vacant since that time.

Historic designation and proposed restoration
In 1988, the building was designated as a City of Los Angeles Historic-Cultural Monument. The building fell into disrepair in the 1990s, and the City of Los Angeles foreclosed on the property after recording an assessment for barricading and protection. In 1998, Hillary Clinton visited the Shul as part of her Save America's Treasures campaign. In July 2000, the City quitclaimed the property to Breed Street Shul Project, Inc., a subsidiary of the Jewish Historical Society of Southern California.  The organization plans to rehabilitate the buildings as a county museum, educational and cultural center.  It was listed on the National Register of Historic Places in 2001.

Rabbis

Solomon Michael Neches (1921–1935)
Jerusalem-born Rabbi Solomon Michael Neches (October 13, 1891 - February 11, 1954) was the first rabbi of the synagogue originally named Congregation Talmud Torah.

Rabbi Neches fought the battles of
 Reform - Rabbi Neches advocated for Orthodox education for the community's Jewish children.
 Kashrut - He was instrumental in California's (first) Kosher Law.
 Jewish education - the name of the shul (Congregation Talmud Torah) made it clear that a Yeshiva/day school would have to await his successor.

Neches also is recognized for having begun the Los Angeles-based
Western Jewish Institute, and initially led it.

He was succeeded as rabbi of the Breed Street shul by Rabbi Osher Zilberstein.

Osher Zilberstein (1935–1973)

Osher Zilberstein (1888–1973), a noted Torah scholar, was a tenth generation rabbi from Mezritch, Ukraine. In 1935 he assumed the rabbinical position as the rabbi of the Breed Street Shul, also known by the name Talmud Torah Los Angeles.

Rabbi Zilberstein was instrumental in the opening of an Orthodox day school, Yeshivas HaMaarav.

He was buried at Home of Peace Cemetery in East Los Angeles, California. His Yartzeit is 14 Shvat (5733) and his father's name was Rabbi Yisroel Aharon Zilberstein. He was born in the Ukraine, immigrated to Winnipeg, Canada in 1924, and moved to Los Angeles in 1935.

Cantors
Cantor Israel Reich (1946-1953) did not begin his career at the Breed Street Shul, nor did he end it there. One of the reasons he was described as a "Cantor's Cantor" was that he "helped train countless students, including his own three children, to become cantors."

See also
Los Angeles Historic-Cultural Monuments on the East and Northeast Sides
 List of Registered Historic Places in Los Angeles
 Hal Bernson, Los Angeles City Council member, 1979-2003

Notes

External links

 Breed Street Shul Project, Inc.
 A Feasibility Study For Saving Congregation Talmud Torah Of Los Angeles, Silverstein, David. 1995 from the American Jewish University

Synagogues in Los Angeles
Boyle Heights, Los Angeles
Synagogues completed in 1923
Los Angeles Historic-Cultural Monuments
Properties of religious function on the National Register of Historic Places in Los Angeles
Jewish organizations established in 1904
Byzantine Revival synagogues
Orthodox Judaism in Los Angeles
Orthodox synagogues in California
Synagogues on the National Register of Historic Places in California